André Filipe da Silva Mendes (born 15 May 2003) is a Brazilian professional footballer who plays as a goalkeeper for Ashton United, on loan from  club Morecambe.

Early life
André Filipe da Silva Mendes was born in Paraná, Brazil and moved to Leiria, Portugal at the age of six.

Career
Mendes spent two years with the Benfica academy as a 13-year-old, before moving to England. He joined the academy at Morecambe in December 2019. He achieved his Level Two coaching award in early 2021. He fractured the scaphoid bone in his hand in a training ground injury sustained towards the end of the 2020–21 season and was ruled out until the end of October. He signed his first professional contract in May 2021. He made his first-team debut on 9 November 2021, when he was named as man of the match during a 2–0 defeat to Carlisle United in an EFL Trophy game at the Globe Arena; he had been called into the team following an injury sustained by Kyle Letheren in the warm-up. Manager Stephen Robinson said that "Barry Roche has high hopes for him and he proved that on the night".

On 2 September 2022, he joined Northern Premier League Division One West club Colne on a one-month loan deal. The loan was later extended until the end of the calendar year.

On 7 January 2023, he joined Northern Premier League side Ashton United on a 28-day loan deal.

Career statistics

References

2003 births
Living people
Sportspeople from Paraná (state)
Brazilian footballers
Association football goalkeepers
S.L. Benfica footballers
Morecambe F.C. players
Colne F.C. players
Ashton United F.C. players
English Football League players
Northern Premier League players
Brazilian expatriate footballers
Expatriate footballers in Portugal
Expatriate footballers in England